Hong Kong Taoist Association The Yuen Yuen Institute No.2 Secondary School was founded in 1988 as the 4th secondary school under the Hong Kong Taoist Association.

Class Structures

Junior Form (F.1-F.3)
 4 classes in each form.
 2 classes will be taught in Chinese and English.
 2 classes will be taught in Chinese.

*：Teaching in English

`：Teaching in Putonghua

Others without markings：Teaching in Cantonese

Senior Secondary (F.4~6) 
4 class in each form.
In 2012, yy2 add Class S. Class S has 20 people. Without taking Electives X and Y, at the same time to take M2. Students that take Physics, Biology, ICT and Economics will be first got into Class S.
In 2021, yy2 change Class E and S into Class C and D. Without taking Electives X and Y, Electives Z also can be chosen.

Form 4 (Estimated)

Form 5

Form 6

*：Teaching in English

Others without markings：Teaching in Cantonese

 Main course: Chinese Language, English Language, Mathematics (Core, M2), Liberal Social.

(In 2021 the system was changed. M2 had been canceled changed, Liberal Social into Citizenship and Social Development)

 Required courses: Physical Education, Ethics & Religious Studies (Only in Form 4), Art Development (Only in Form 5).
 Elective Courses: Students can take one of Electives in X, Y, Z. (For detailed elective subject information, please refer to the table above.)

Famous alumni
 Ms. Kwong Mei-fung, Mabel - former TVB News reporter

External links
  

Secondary schools in Hong Kong
Educational institutions established in 1988
Tai Po
1988 establishments in Hong Kong